Jordan James Reyes (born October 5, 1986), known professionally as Jeordi is an American musician, international songwriter and vocal producer. He is an 8-time platinum selling songwriter and held the fourth most played song of the decade in the entire country of Finland (2010-2020). As a vocal producer and songwriter, he has co-written in sessions with many notable artists including Queen Latifah, Rotimi, Adrian Marcel, Krewella and Alex Aiono. Reyes has also contributed his writing to many major label releases worldwide including international artists, Lu Han (former member of K-pop boy group EXO) and both Evelina, Nikee Ankara (Universal Music Group Finland artists). He is also the co-founder of music publishing house Red Matter Recordings.

Life and career

Career beginnings 
Reyes, who is of Filipino  descent and native of Uptown, Chicago, began by singing in the church choir. His father was a musician as well and often travelled across the US as a family, with his touring band. Reyes started songwriting and toplining at the University of Illinois at Urbana-Champaign in dorm rooms and started recording his own vocals on top of beats with classmates. His first serious exposure to any kind of renowned recording studio was in 2009 at an impromptu invitation to a few recording/writing sessions in Hollywood, CA. The session included new songwriter Bruno Mars, and steady climbing production team the Stereotypes. Reyes recalls being in awe listening to the quality in writing and lyrics in the demos played. That night he decided to commit to his craft by throwing away his own demos and starting from scratch.

In 2013, Reyes eventually secured an internship with CRUSH music group working on label and administration releases for artists Sia, Fall Out Boy and Travie McCoy. This led to a position at Warner Music Group as a publishing administrator in 2016 working on international licensing. After a year, Reyes was offered his own worldwide publishing deal (coincidentally with Warner Music Group) as a songwriter and left to pursue his dream full time.

2016–present 
Reyes was mentored for several years by songwriter and producer Henkka “MGI” Lanz, who signed Reyes to his publishing company M-Eazy Music in collaboration with Warner Music Group - Finland. While under MGI's tutelage, Reyes co-wrote many songs, including hits such as Evelina's “Honey," "Sushi," and Nikee Ankara’s "Ootsa Nahny Nikee.”

By 2017–2018, Reyes would co-write 2 original songs for the new Fox Animation franchise "Ice Age 5: Collision Course" film trailers, that would air in the US and Latin Markets. This would open up new opportunities in the world of Film/TV. Sync licensing placements included television shows on MTV, Netflix, Hulu, USA Network, The CW, E! Entertainment, NFL Network, Sky Sports etc.

Writing camps 
In February 2019, Reyes received an invitation to attend Stockholm Songwriting Camp, which was held in Budapest, Hungary. He was the only American resident selected and it would expose him to a new perspective, the global market. He would connect and collaborate with writers/producers from the UK, Germany, Sweden, Ireland, Singapore, Mexico, Hungary and France. That same trip, he would travel to collaborate with producers in Berlin, Vienna and Paris.

Later that year, in November 2019, Reyes would accept another invitation to attend The Woods Norway Songwriting camp held in the English countryside miles from London, United Kingdom. The camp included artists from Germany, Norway, Sweden and of course UK. He later held his own camps in London with many of the musicians from the previous camps. These camps would eventually come full circle with many of those international musicians coming to work with him once he returned to Los Angeles, CA.

Asia market 
By the end of 2019, Reyes attended the KCON convention in LA, which celebrated K-Pop music. While sharing experiences and networking, he would be invited to his first K-pop songwriting camp help in Los Angeles. In May 2020, Reyes landed his first placement in the Asia territories China and Korea, co-writing the hit single "Slow Motion" for artist Lu Han (former member of K-pop boy group EXO). Upon its release, LuHan's album "π-volume.3" exceeded 2,000,000 copies in sales - Ranking first in the QQ music best-seller charts! With this certification, Reyes would achieve certified diamond status for his writing contribution to the hit single.

Songwriting discography

TV/Film licensing

References

External links 

Red Matter Music Pub
Jordan James Reyes at Discogs
Jordan James Reyes at Instagram
Jordan James Reyes at Twitter

1986 births
Living people
Songwriters from California
Warner Music Finland singles
Warner Music Group